Events in the year 1995 in Germany.

Incumbents
President - Roman Herzog
Chancellor – Helmut Kohl

Events 
9-22 February - 45th Berlin International Film Festival
13 May — Germany in the Eurovision Song Contest 1995
14 May — North Rhine-Westphalia state election, 1995
 September - T-Online was founded in Berlin.
 Private company Deutsche Post was founded in Bonn.

Births
8 February — Joshua Kimmich, German football player
1 August — Tina Punzel, German diver

Deaths
9 January — Gisela Mauermayer, German athlete (born 1913)
19 January — Hermann Henselmann, German architect (born 1905)
28 January — Adolf Butenandt, German chemist (born 1903)
1 March — Georges J. F. Köhler, German biologist (born 1946)
28 March — Hanns-Joachim Friedrichs, German journalist (born 1927)
2 May — Werner Veigel, German journalist and news speaker (born 1928)
31 July — Lotte Rausch, German actress (born 1913)
18 August — Helmuth Schlömer, Wehrmacht general (born 1893)
28 August — Michael Ende, writer (born 1929)
15 September — Dietrich Hrabak, German fighter pilot (born 1914)
16 September — Hans Häckermann, German actor (born 1930)
29 September — Gerd Bucerius, German journalist (born 1906)
26 November — Wim Thoelke, German television presenter (born 1927)
18 December — Konrad Zuse, German  civil engineer, inventor and computer pioneer (born 1910)
30 December — Heiner Müller, German dramatist, poet, writer, essayist and theatre director (born 1929)

References

See also
1995 in German television

 
Years of the 20th century in Germany
1990s in Germany
Germany
Germany